Qiu  may refer to:

Qiū (surname), Chinese surnames
Qiú (surname), Chinese surnames
Qiu County, in Hebei, China
Kǒng Qiū, better known as Confucius
Qiu!, a 2005 album by the ambient post-rock band Windsor Airlift